Pieter Nassen (born 16 January 1944) is a Belgian racing cyclist. He rode 5 editions of the Tour de France, and won the intermediate sprints classification in 1971. He also won three stages of the Vuelta a España.

Major results
1970
 2nd Nationale Sluitingprijs
 3rd Flèche Hesbignonne
1971
 1st  Intermediate sprints classification Tour de France
1972
 1st Stage 5 Vuelta a España
1973
 1st Stages 1 & 3 Vuelta a España

References

External links
 

1944 births
Living people
Belgian male cyclists
Belgian Vuelta a España stage winners
People from Riemst
Cyclists from Limburg (Belgium)
20th-century Belgian people